Bilen may refer to:
Bilen people
Bilen language
Bilen (surname)

Language and nationality disambiguation pages